Busan Metro Line 2 is a line of the Busan Metro that crosses Busan, South Korea, from east to west, running along the shores of Haeundae and Gwanganli, and then north toward Yangsan. The line uses trains that have six cars each.

A ride through the entire line takes about 1 hour 24 minutes. Busan Metro Line 2 will be expanded from Jangsan Station to East Busan Tourism Complex in Gijang County which will be opened in 2021. (Currently Planned)

History
Plans to create the line began in 1987 and were finalized by 1991. During the construction of the third section of the line in 2001, the original plan to extend the route three stations beyond Yangsan Station was scrapped at the request of the citizens of Yangsan, with a new light rail line currently undergoing approval as an alternative.

An older plan hoped to stretch the line four stations beyond Jangsan Station, but was scrapped due to cost concerns. The extension idea has gained new interest, but with proposals for a new light rail line connecting Jangsan Station to the city of Ulsan.

1990s
 November 28, 1991: Constructed the first section from Seomyeon Station (219) to Hopo Station (239).
 October 27, 1994: Constructed the second section from Jangsan Station (201) to Seomyeon Station (219).
 June 30, 1999: Commenced first section service from Seomyeon Station (219) to Hopo Station (239).

2000s
 August 8, 2001: Commenced second section service from Geumnyeonsan Station (210) to Seomyeon Station (219).
 December 2001: Constructed the third section from Hopo Station (239) to Yangsan Station (243).
 January 16, 2002: Commenced second section service from Geumnyeonsan Station (210) to Gwangan Station (209).
 August 29, 2002: Commenced second section service from Jangsan Station (201) to Gwangan Station (209).
 January 10, 2008: Opened Namyangsan Station (242) and Yangsan Station (243).
 October 1, 2009: Opened Pusan National University Yangsan Campus Station (241).

2010s
 November 4, 2014: Munjeon Station (217) renamed to Busan International Finance Center–Busan Bank Station.
 September 24, 2015: Opened Jeungsan Station (240).

List of stations

External links

Busan Transportation Corporation's official website

2
Railway lines opened in 1999
1999 establishments in South Korea